Philosophia Mathematica is a philosophical journal devoted to the philosophy of mathematics, published by Oxford University Press. The journal publishes three issues per year.

External links 
Philosophia Mathematica @ Oxford Journals

Philosophy of mathematics journals
Logic journals